Thomas and Latitia Gluyas House is a historic home located near Huntersville, Mecklenburg County, North Carolina. It was built about 1865, and is a two-story, three bay, I-house with a one-story rear ell. It has side gable roof, exterior brick end chimneys, and a full-width hip roofed porch.

It was listed on the National Register of Historic Places in 2001.

References

Houses on the National Register of Historic Places in North Carolina
Houses completed in 1865
Houses in Charlotte, North Carolina
National Register of Historic Places in Mecklenburg County, North Carolina